Rodney Victor Taylor (9 September 1943 – 16 April 2018) was an English professional footballer of the 1960s.  He played professionally for Portsmouth, Gillingham, and Bournemouth & Boscombe Athletic.

Career
Taylor's career began at Portsmouth as a ground staff boy in 1958 and at the age of 17, he signed his first professional contract at Pompey, going on to play at Fratton Park for two seasons.  He joined Gillingham in July 1963 and spent three years at Priestfield. In 1966, he returned to Dorset to play for Bournemouth & Boscombe Athletic under manager Freddie Cox, who had signed him at Gillingham.  He made 30 appearances for the Cherries in the Fourth Division, before joining Poole Town in August 1967 followed by Andover in 1971.

To support his family after his playing career, Taylor went into partnership with fellow Pompey and Cherries player Tony Priscott in the building trade.  He died in April 2018 and, after having his brain donated and examined by the neuropathologist Dr Willie Stewart in a similar way as Jeff Astle, it was proved that he was suffering from Dementia with Lewy bodies and CTE.  His daughter was made a Trustee of the Jeff Astle Foundation as well as working alongside The Professional Footballers Association union on an initial six-month advisory basis, to help shape the neurodegenerative care provision for former members and their families.

References

1943 births
2018 deaths
English footballers
Association football defenders
English Football League players
Portsmouth F.C. players
Gillingham F.C. players